Aethes margaritana, the silver coast conch, is a moth of the family Tortricidae. It was described by Adrian Hardy Haworth in 1811. It is found in most of Europe. The habitat consists of downland, waste ground and shingle beaches.

Adults have a silky-white ground colour with yellow-ochreous transverse markings. They are on wing from May to June and again from July to August in two generations per year.

The larvae feed on Chrysanthemum, Tanacetum, Achillea, Matricaria and Chamomilla species. They live in the flowers and seeds of their host plant. The species overwinters and pupates in the larval habitation during spring.

References

margaritana
Moths described in 1811
Moths of Europe
Taxa named by Adrian Hardy Haworth